Gian Giacomo Medici (25 January 1498 – 8 November 1555) was an Italian condottiero who became a noted Spanish general, Duke of Marignano and Marquess of Musso and Lecco in Lombardy.

Biography
Gian Giacomo Medici was the brother of Giovanni Angelo Medici, who was later to be elected Pope as Pius IV. They were scions of an impoverished, though patrician, family of Milan not connected with the Medici of Florence, in spite of the Medici heraldic palle appearing in the contemporary engraving (illustration): thus the nickname Il Medeghino, the "little Medici". 

Gian Giacomo, the eldest of fourteen children, was banished from Milan after a daring murder of revenge in broad daylight. He fled to Lake Como where he gathered about him a band of brigands answerable to none but him. He threw in his lot as bodyguard to the future Duke of Milan, Francesco II Sforza, who had been reinstated in Milan by Emperor Charles V. The Medeghino gained a reputation for unscrupulous violence in the Sforza pay; in partial recompense, he was made Marquis of Marignano on 28 March 1528 (by Imperial patent and confirmed by Francesco Sforza II, Duke of Milan), and also Marquis of Musso and Lecco.  

That he fled to Lake Como was no coincidence. For, he was born in Valsolda which is a part of the community of Porlezza. Evidence can be found that Marquis Giacomo di Medici was born in Valsolda and even had a residence in the community of Porlezza. In the main church of Cima, which belongs to the community of Porlezza, an inconspicuous relief shows the lion of San Marco, a symbol of the alliance between Gian Giacomo de Medici and the former Republic of Venice. It was put there in honour of his achievements. A description of the relief can be found on a plaque alongside.

It is likely that Gian Giacomo even had a residence in Cima, on the same spot where now stands a hotel, probably not called by chance Parco San Marco.

Il Medeghino became a famous condottiere, or soldier of fortune, who fought in the pay of Charles V at the Battle of Mühlberg and elsewhere in Italy (the "War of Siena"), in the Wars of Religion in France and in the Low Countries. The great engineer Agostino Ramelli trained with Gian Giacomo, who instructed him in mathematics and architecture.

In 1543 he purchased the ancient fortified castle of Frascarolo, near present-day Induno Olona, in the Valceresio, which he converted into a sumptuous villa,. In the summer of 1545 he married Marzia Orsini, daughter of Ludovico Orsini, conte di Pitigliano. He was made a knight of the Order of the Golden Fleece in 1555, also the year of his death. Il Medeghino is buried in the Duomo of Milan.

Since his only son, Camillo (died after 1586), was illegitimate, albeit made a Knight of the Order of Malta, Gian Giacomo's honours passed to his brother Agosto (1501–1570).

References

External links
Medici di Marignano: genealogical notes

1490s births
1555 deaths
Military personnel from Milan
16th-century condottieri
Nobility from Milan
Military leaders of the Italian Wars
Knights of the Golden Fleece
Burials at Milan Cathedral
Papal family members